These are the official results of the Men's 800 metres event at the 1993 IAAF World Championships in Stuttgart, Germany. There were a total number of 44 participating athletes, with six qualifying heats, three semi-finals and the final held on Tuesday 1993-08-17.

With three Kenyans qualified for the final, word was out that they might send out time qualifier Paul Ruto as the sacrificial lamb to burn out the field.  Freddie Williams was the leader from the gun, but just before the break Ruto rushed to the lead and it appeared the strategy was in effect.  The rest of the field cooperated and fell in line behind him.  Ruto checked back at 200 metres and again at 300 metres, but nobody was challenging.  Ruth had a 5 metre lead at the bell in 51.22.  William Tanui moved forward early and was the next back through the turn followed by Curtis Robb.  Along the backstretch. Williams began a run at Ruto, around Robb followed by Giuseppe D'Urso, Tanui was falling through the field with Billy Konchellah in dead last place, it looked like the Kenyan team strategy was going to blow up.  Coming off the final turn, Williams looked like he had set Ruto up and was going to sprint by, but instead Williams could make no forward progress, his body delaying D'Urso and Ruto again had a 2 meter lead.  D'Urso chased Ruto down the straightaway but couldn't make any progress.  Everybody else in the field sliding further away except Konchellah, still last off the turn but the field tightening, Konchellah moved out to lane 3 to avoid traffic and sprinted past the crowd, chasing D'Urso to the line but not quite getting there in time.  Ruto the surprise winner holding the lead virtually the entire race.

Medalists

Final

Semi-finals
Held on Sunday 1993-08-15

Qualifying heats
Held on Saturday 1993-08-14

See also
 1992 Men's Olympic 800 metres

References
 Results

 
800 metres at the World Athletics Championships